Warren Edward Barhorst (born April 6, 1965) is an American businessman who is the founder and chief executive officer of Iscential, based in Houston, Texas. He is a former member of the 12th Man Kickoff Team at Texas A&M University, his alma mater.

Career 
Upon completing college, Barhorst went to work for Mannesmann Demag from January 1989 until August 1993. After growing frustrated with the corporate world, he quit his job and began selling Nationwide insurance. Soon after making his career change, Barhorst started his own insurance company, the Barhorst Insurance Group (BIG), in September 1993. The first office opened in November 1993 in Jersey Village. Barhorst rebranded the company to Iscential in January 2012.

Since its inception, Iscential has grown from one office to 24 across Texas with 100 associates and more than $70 million in sales in 2012. Barhorst has plans to continue his company's expansion with his BIG Billion plan, which sets a goal of 500 offices and $1 billion in sales by 2020. He is already making strides to reach that goal, securing funding to open 12 new locations in 2009. Barhorst is also a published author. In late 2008 he released "Game Plan... The Definitive Playbook for Starting or Growing Your Business". Forbes business magazine editor-in-chief Steve Forbes, who reviewed the book, had nothing but praise for the work. He said the book had "energy, stick-to-it-iveness, focus and a sense of strategy and attention to tactics." Barhorst is currently working on a follow-up to this book.

Awards and recognition 
Since its 1993 inception, Iscential, (formerly known as the Barhorst Insurance Group, or BIG) has earned many accolades. Iscential was named to the Aggie 100 list in 2005, 2006 and 2008; ranked No. 3,359 as part of the 2008 Inc. Magazine 5000, a list of the country's fastest growing companies; and was named the 52nd fastest growing company in Houston by the Houston Business Journal  in 2008, as well. In 2009 Iscential climbed to 29th on the fastest growing company in Houston rankings by the Houston Business Journal. Iscential also moved up to be ranked No. 2,237 on Inc. Magazine's list of the country's fastest growing companies (BIG has been included on the list from 2008–2011). A tribute to its commitment to employee satisfaction, Iscential has frequently been listed as one of the Best Places to Work in Texas, Best Places to Work in Houston, and Best & Brightest Places to Work.

Barhorst was named Ernst & Young Entrepreneur of the Year for the Houston Gulf Coast Area for Business Services in 2008. The company has also received several awards from Nationwide. In addition to being the No. 1 Nationwide agency in the country, Iscential has earned the Presidents Conference Award every year since 1998. It was named the Nationwide Flood Insurance Agency of the Year in 2005 and in 2006, and received the National Flood Insurance Special Recognition Award for Flood Education and Marketing in 2008.

In April 2012, Barhorst was featured on the cover of Smart Business Houston magazine with an article on how he transformed a start-up insurance agency into the largest Nationwide agency in the U.S. In February 2013, Barhorst received an "Excellence in Mentoring" award from the University of Houston's Wolff Center for Entrepreneurship.

References 

Living people
21st-century American businesspeople
1965 births